Muhammad Zamnur is an Indonesian footballer who plays as a forward. He currently plays for Persinga Ngawi.

References

Indonesian Premier Division players
Living people
Indonesian footballers
Association football forwards
Year of birth missing (living people)